Fatal Bond is a 1991 Australian erotic thriller film, directed by Vince Monton, starring Linda Blair and Jerome Ehlers. It was filmed in the Northern Beaches area of Sydney, New South Wales, including Narrabeen Caravan Park.

Synopsis
Leonie Stevens is a hairdresser who dates the charming Joe Martinez who may or may not be a serial killer.

Cast

Linda Blair as Leonie Stevens
Jerome Ehlers as Joe Martinez
Stephen Leeder as Anthony Boon
Donal Gibson as Rocky Borgetta
Joe Bugner as Claw Miller
Caz Lederman as Detective Chenko
Teo Gebert as Shane Boon
Penny Pederson as Bree Boon
Roger Ward as Detective Greaves
Ross Newton as John Harding
Kevin Johnson as himself
Caroline Beck as Jenny
Jan Adele as Mrs Karvan
Lyndon Harris as Joy Turner
Ken Snodgrass as Sgt. Taylor
Peter Browne as Caravan Man
Bob Barrett as Fisherman Bob
Jim Winshuttle as Fisherman
Donna Lee as Celia Boon
Ron Holbrow as Celia's Husband

Production
Avalon was going to cast Russell Crowe as a villain but Universal then contacted them and said they were interested in buying the film if Donal Gibson, Mel's brother, was cast. Donal Gibson got the role.

Box office
Fatal Bond grossed $13,871 at the box office in Australia.

See also
Cinema of Australia

References

External links

Fatal Bond at the National Film and Sound Archive
Fatal Bond at Oz Movies

1992 films
Australian erotic thriller films
1990s erotic thriller films
1990s English-language films
1990s Australian films